I Fighter Command was a United States Army Air Forces intermediate command responsible for command and control of the fighter operations within the First Air Force during World War II.  It was initially established in June 1941 as the 1st Interceptor Command to provide air defense of the Northeastern United States.  Following the attack on Pearl Harbor, the command's area of responsibility extended over the entire Atlantic coast and into Canada and Iceland.  As the perceived threat of attack decreased, the command's responsibnility for training units and aircrews became its primary mission.  The command continued its mission until March 1946, when it was inactivated.

History

Background
GHQ Air Force (GHQ AF) had been established with two major combat functions, to maintain a striking force against long range targets, and the air defense of the United States.  In the spring of 1941, the War Department established four strategic defense areas and GHQ, AF reorganized its Northeast Air District as 1st Air Force with responsibility for air defense planning and organization along the eastern seaboard.  Simultaneously, an Air Defense Command was established at Mitchel Field to plan the air defense of the United States and develop air defense doctrine.

1st Air Force activated 1st Interceptor Command at Mitchel Field on 5 June 1941, under the command of Brigadier General John C. McDonnell, drawing its personnel from Air Defense Command, which inactivated three days earlier.  The command's initial tactical components were the 6th and 7th Pursuit Wings

Air Defense
Shortly after the attack on Pearl Harbor, the command moved its headquarters to New York City.  Here, as the importance of the North Atlantic supply line grew, it assumed responsibility for planning the air defense of Newfoundland and Nova Scotia.  It selected radar sites in cooperation with Canadian authorities and worked to standardize aircraft warning procedures there.  In June 1942, the command returned to Mitchel and would remain there until inactivated.  The command dispatched the 33d Pursuit Squadron to provide air defense in Iceland in July.  The command organized Detachment A to manage the 33rd, along with antiaircraft artillery and signal warning units involved in the air defense of Iceland.

The command was charged with control of "active agents" for air defense in its area of responsibility, which included interceptor aircraft, antiaircraft artillery and barrage balloons.  Civilian organizations provided air raid warnings and enforced blackouts and came under the authority of the Office of Civilian Defense.  Radar was initially not sufficiently developed to be included in air defense systems, There were only eight radars under construction to guard the Atlantic coast, but the command worked "feverishly" to create a ground observer corps and coastal radar net as elements of its Aircraft Warning Service.  However, it soon became apparent that having two commands responsible for air defense in the Eastern Theater of Operations was impractical, and in early 1942, the command took over responsibility for air defense of the East and part of the Gulf coast.

However, 1st Bomber Command soon focused on antisubmarine warfare. Regional air defense wings were established in August 1942 at Boston, New York, Philadelphia, and Norfolk. The command's mission of fighter control later expanded to providing emergency flight services to other aircraft and assisting in air sea rescue.

Unit and crew training
In 1942, Air Force Combat Command had established an Operational Training Unit (OTU) system for 2nd and 3d Air Forces.  The system was later extended to 1st Air Force.  Although it was originally intended to confine the OTU system to 2d and 3rd Air Forces, too much of the AAF's aircrew and aircraft were assigned to 1st Air Force to permit the command to forego training responsibilities entirely.  In May 1942, all pursuit groups assumed Operational Training Unit (OTU) responsibility.   The command also trained fighter units and personnel.  By the end of 1942, the command's training consisted almost entirely of OTUs.  As units deployed overseas, the command's training mission shifted to training individuals in Replacement Training Units (RTU).

Inactivation
After the end of the war it was inactivated on 21 March 1946. After September 1947, all former Air Corps units were transferred to the United States Air Force, which disbanded the command in October 1948.

Lineage
 Constituted as the  1st Interceptor Command on 26 May 1941 
 Activated on 5 June 1941
 Redesignated 1st Fighter Command 15 May 1942
 Redesignated I Fighter Command c. 18 September 1942
 Inactivated on 21 March 1946
 Disbanded on 8 October 1948

Assignments
 First Air Force, 26 May 1941 – 21 March 1946

Stations
 Mitchel Field, New York, 5 June 1941
 New York City, New York, 27 December 1941
 Mitchel Field, New York, 9 June 1942 – 21 March 1946

Components
 Wings
 3rd Air Defense Wing, 12 December 1942 – c. 7 February 1943
 6th Pursuit Wing, 5 June 1941 – 7 December 1941
 7th Pursuit Wing, 5 June 1941 – 31 August 1941
 301st Fighter Wing: attached 15 October 1944 – 21 May 1945
 Boston Air Defense Wing (later Boston Fighter Wing): 11 August 1942 – 13 February 1945 (not manned after July 1944)
 New York Air Defense Wing (later New York Fighter Wing): 11 August 1942 – 3 April 1946 (not manned after July 1944)
 Norfolk Air Defense Wing (later Norfolk Fighter Wing): 11 August 1942 – 3 April 1946 (not manned after July 1944)
 Philadelphia Air Defense Wing (later Philadelphia Fighter Wing): 11 August 1942 – 3 April 1946 (not manned after July 1944)

 Groups

 8th Pursuit Group: 31 August 1941 – 6 March 1942
 31st Pursuit Group: 1 October 1941 – 18 April 1942
 33d Pursuit Group (later 33d Fighter Group): 2 October 1941 – 11 August 1942
 52d Pursuit Group (later 52d Fighter Group): 1 October 1941 – c. 15 June 1942
 56th Pursuit Group (later 56th Fighter Group): 15 January – 11 August 1942
 57th Pursuit Group (later 57th Fighter Group): 1 September 1941 – c. 16 July 1942
 58th Fighter Group: 17 October 1942 – 19 November 1943
 79th Fighter Group: 22 June – November 1942
 80th Fighter Group: 4 July – 11 August 1942
 325th Fighter Group: 3–11 August 1942
 355th Fighter Group: 18 February – c. 6 July 1943
 366th Fighter Group: 1 June 1943 – 8 January 1944 (attached to Philadelphia Air Defense Wing to 20 November 1943)

 Squadrons

 52nd Interceptor Control Squadron: c. 30 November 1941 – c. 1 January 1942
 90th Fighter Control Squadron: 15 March 1943 – 10 April 1944
 91st Fighter Control Squadron: 15 March 1943 – 10 April 1944
 92nd Fighter Control Squadron: 1 April 1943 – 10 April 1944
 93rd Fighter Control Squadron: c. 1 June 1943 – 10 April 1944, 1 October 1944 – 31 March 1945
 94th Fighter Control Squadron: 1 April 1943 – 10 April 1944, 1 October 1944 – March 1945
 95th Fighter Control Squadron: 1 April 1943 – c. 31 March 1944
 96th Fighter Control Squadron: 15 May 1943 – 1944
 302nd Fighter Control Squadron: 20 January 1944 – c. 31 March 1944
 305th Fighter Control Squadron: 1 April – 19 December 1943
 321st Fighter Control Squadron: 15 May 1943 – 8 January 1944
 325th Fighter Control Squadron: 1 April – c. 15 December 1943
 403d Fighter Squadron: 7 August – 15 December 1943
 453d Fighter Squadron: 20 November – 1 December 1943

 Aircraft warning units
 Signal Aircraft Warning Service, 1 Interceptor Command (later Signal Aircraft Warning Service, I Fighter Command: c. 30 November 1941 – c. 1 May 1944
 502nd Signal Regiment (Aircraft Warning): c. 15 December 1941 – January 1942

 Base units

 102nd AAF Base Unit (Headquarters, I Fighter Command): c 10 April 1944 – 21 March 1946 
 103rd AAF Base Unit (Boston Fighter Wing): c 10 April 1944 – c. 31 July 1944
 104th AAF Base Unit (New York Fighter Wing): c 10 April 1944 – c. 31 July 1944
 105th AAF Base Unit (Philadelphia Fighter Wing): c 10 April 1944 – c. 31 July 1944
 106th AAF Base Unit (Norfolk Fighter Wing): c 10 April 1944 – c. 31 July 1944
 160th AAF Base Unit (Fighter Control) 10 April 1944 – 15 November 1945
 161st AAF Base Unit (Fighter Control) 10 April 1944 – c. 1 September 1945
 162nd AAF Base Unit (Fighter Control) 10 April 1944 – c. 31 July 1944
 163rd AAF Base Unit (Fighter Control) 10 April 1944 – c. 30 June 1944
 164th AAF Base Unit (Fighter Control) 10 April 1944 – c. 1 December 1945
 165th AAF Base Unit (Fighter Control) 10 April 1944 – c. 23 October 1944

Campaign

References

Notes
Explanatory notes

Citations

Bibliography 

 
 
 
 
 

01 Command Fighter
Military units and formations disestablished in 1948